Gorkha Secondary School is a secondary school located in the heart of Lumbini Province, Tulsipur, Nepal.

The school has been awarded with International School Award by British Council.

References

External links
Official Website

Secondary schools in Nepal
Buildings and structures in Dang District, Nepal